The coastal riffle sculpin (Cottus ohlone) is a species of freshwater ray-finned fish belonging to the family Cottidae, the typical sculpins. It is endemic to the Coast Range Mountains of California, where it is found in streams draining to the west and southwest. This taxon was considered to be conspecific with the inland riffle sculpin (Cottus gulosus) until research published in 2020 by Peter B. Moyle and Matthew A . Campbell showed that it was a separate valid species which was split into two subspecies. One, C.o. pomo, found in the northern Russian River and north San Francisco Bay drainage; and the other, C.o. ohlone, in the southern Santa Clara Valley. The specific name honors the Ohlone people, a Native American group which lived around southern San Francisco Bay and the Santa Clara Valley.

References

Coastal riffle sculpin
Fish described in 2022